DeAnna Danielle Bennett  (born November 18, 1984) is an American mixed martial artist who competes in the Flyweight division in  Bellator. As of December 13, 2022, she is #4 in the Bellator Women's Flyweight Rankings.

Background
Bennett wrestled and played water polo for American High School before graduating in 2002. Bennett briefly attended an art college, but dropped out. She credits her "being a fat kid" for motivating her to join a kickboxing gym to stay in shape, and eventually competing in Muay Thai kickboxing.

Mixed martial arts career

Early career
After a short amateur MMA career in 2011, Bennett made her professional MMA debut in February 2012 for Showdown Fights.  She competed for the promotion four times over the next two years, winning all of her bouts. Notably beating stand outs Sharon Jacobson, Colleen Schneider and Julianna Peña respectively.

Invicta FC
Bennett made her Invicta FC debut on September 6, 2014, at Invicta FC 8, where she defeated Michelle Ould by TKO in the second round.

In her second fight for the promotion, Bennett faced Jennifer Maia on December 5, 2014, at Invicta FC 10.  She won the fight by unanimous decision.

Bennett next faced Norma Rueda Center on February 27, 2015, at Invicta FC 11.  She again won the fight by unanimous decision.

The Ultimate Fighter
In August 2017, it was announced that Bennett would be one of the fighters featured on The Ultimate Fighter 26, where the process to crown the UFC's inaugural 125-pound women's champion will take place. Bennett was selected seventh by coach Eddie Alvarez. She faced Karine Gevorgyan in the opening round and won via TKO in the first round. In the quarter finals Bennett faced Sijara Eubanks losing via first round knockout.

Ultimate Fighting Championship 
Bennett faced  Melinda Fábián on December 1, 2017 at The Ultimate Fighter: A New World Champion#The Ultimate Fighter 26 Finale. The fight ended as a majority draw and Bennett was subsequently released from the promotion.

Return to Invicta
Bennett returned to Invicta to face Karina Rodríguez on March 24, 2018 at Invicta FC 28: Morandin vs. Jandiroba. She won the fight by split decision. Bennett then entered a flyweight tournament where she defeated Miranda Maverick by unanimous decision but lost in the final in a rematch against Karina Rodriguez.

Bellator
Bennett made her promotional debut against Liz Carmouche at Bellator 246 on September 12, 2020. She lost the bout via a rear-naked choke submission in the third round.

Bennett was scheduled to face Alejandra Lara on July 31, 2021 at Bellator 263. The bout was rescheduled for unknown reasons to take place on August 20, 2021 at Bellator 265. On August 13, it was announced that the bout was moved once again, this time to Bellator 266. At the weigh-ins, Bennett missed weight for her bout. Bennett weighed in at 129.2 pounds, 3.2 pounds over the flyweight non-title fight limit. The bout proceeded at catchweight and Bennett was fined a percentage of her purse which went to Lara. Bennett won the bout in dominant fashion via unanimous decision.

Bennett faced Justine Kish on February 19, 2022 at Bellator 274. She won the bout in dominant fashion via unanimous decision.

Bennett rematched Justine Kish on August 12, 2022 at Bellator 284. At weigh ins, Kish came in at 128.4 lbs, 2.4 pounds over the weight limit, for the flyweight bout, resulting in her being a fined a percentage of her purse which went to Bennett and the bout proceeded at catchweight. Bennett won the bout again via unanimous decision.

Bennett is scheduled to face Liz Carmouche for the Bellator Women's Flyweight World Championship on April 21, 2023 at Bellator 294.

Mixed martial arts record

|-
|Win
|align=center|13–7–1
|Justine Kish
|Decision (unanimous)
|Bellator 284
|
|align=center|3
|align=center|5:00
|Sioux Falls, South Dakota, United States
|
|-
|Win
|align=center|12–7–1
|Justine Kish
|Decision (unanimous)
|Bellator 274
|
|align=center|3
|align=center|5:00
|Uncasville, Connecticut, United States
|
|- 
|Win
|align=center|11–7–1
|Alejandra Lara
|Decision (unanimous)
|Bellator 266
|
|align=center|3
|align=center|5:00
|San Jose, California, United States
|
|- 
|Loss
|align=center|10–7–1
|Liz Carmouche
|Submission (rear-naked choke)
|Bellator 246
|
|align=center|3
|align=center|3:17
|Uncasville, Connecticut, United States
|
|- 
|Loss
|align=center|10–6–1
|Miranda Maverick
|Submission (neck crank)
|Invicta FC Phoenix Series 2
|
|align=center|3
|align=center|3:38
|Kansas City, Kansas, United States
|
|-
|Loss
|align=center|10–5–1
|Karina Rodríguez
|Decision (unanimous)
|Invicta FC 35: Bennett vs. Rodriguez II
|
|align=center|3
|align=center|5:00
|Kansas City, Kansas, United States
|
|-
|Win
|align=center|10–4–1
|Miranda Maverick
|Decision (unanimous)
|Invicta FC 34: Porto vs. Gonzalez
|
|align=center|3
|align=center|5:00
|Kansas City, Missouri, United States
|
|-
|Loss
|align=center|9–4–1
|Kelly Kobold
|Decision (unanimous)
|Tuff-N-Uff Fight Night
|
|align=center|3
|align=center|5:00
|Las Vegas, Nevada, United States
|
|-
|Win
|align=center|9–3–1
|Karina Rodríguez
|Decision (split)
|Invicta FC 28: Mizuki vs. Jandiroba
|
|align=center|3
|align=center|5:00
|Salt Lake City, Utah, United States
|
|-
|Draw
|align=center|8–3–1
|Melinda Fábián
|Draw (majority)
|The Ultimate Fighter: A New World Champion Finale 
|
|align=center|3
|align=center|5:00
|Las Vegas, Nevada, United States
|
|-
|Loss
|align=center|8–3
|Jodie Esquibel
|Decision (split)
|Invicta FC 22: Evinger vs. Kunitskaya II
|
|align=center|3
|align=center|5:00
|Kansas City, Missouri, United States
|
|-
|Loss
|align=center|8–2
|Roxanne Modafferi
|Decision (split)
|Invicta FC 16: Hamasaki vs. Brown
|
|align=center|3
|align=center|5:00
|Las Vegas, Nevada, United States
|
|-
| Loss
|align=center| 8–1
| Lívia Renata Souza
| TKO (body kick and punches)
|Invicta FC 15: Cyborg vs. Ibragimova
|
|align=center|1
|align=center|1:30
|Costa Mesa, California, United States
|
|-
|Win
|align=center|8–0
|Katja Kankaanpää
|Decision (unanimous)
|Invicta FC 14: Evinger vs. Kianzad
|
|align=center|3
|align=center|5:00
|Kansas City, Missouri, United States
|
|-
|Win
|align=center|7–0
|Norma Rueda Center
|Decision (unanimous)
|Invicta FC 11: Cyborg vs. Tweet
|
|align=center|3
|align=center|5:00
|Los Angeles, California, United States
|
|-
|Win
|align=center|6–0
|Jennifer Maia
|Decision (unanimous)
|Invicta FC 10: Waterson vs. Tiburcio
|
|align=center|3
|align=center|5:00
|Houston, Texas, United States
|
|-
|Win
|align=center|5–0
|Michelle Ould
|TKO (body kick)
|Invicta FC 8: Waterson vs. Tamada
|
|align=center| 2
|align=center| 1:34
|Kansas City, Missouri, United States
|
|-
|Win
|align=center|4–0
|Colleen Schneider
|Submission (rear-naked choke)
|Showdown Fights 14: Heavyweight Collision
|
|align=center|1
|align=center|3:02
|Orem, Utah, United States
|
|-
|Win
|align=center|3–0
|Sharon Jacobson
|Submission (rear-naked choke)
|Showdown Fights 13
|
|align=center|1
|align=center|2:12
|Orem, Utah, United States
|
|-
|Win
|align=center|2–0
|Julianna Peña
|Decision (unanimous)
|Showdown Fights 10
|
|align=center|3
|align=center|5:00
|Orem, Utah, United States
|
|-
|Win
|align=center|1–0
|Andrea Miller
|TKO (punches)
|Showdown Fights 6 - Breakout
|
|align=center|1
|align=center|2:41
|Orem, Utah, United States
|
|-

Mixed martial arts exhibition record

|-
|Win
|align=center|3–1
|Daiana Torquato
|Submission (rear-naked choke)
|Invicta FC Phoenix Series 2
|
|align=center|1
|align=center|3:34
|Kansas City, Kansas, United States
|
|-
|Win
|align=center|2–1
|Liz Tracy
|Decision (unanimous)
|Invicta FC Phoenix Series 2
|
|align=center|1
|align=center|5:00
|Kansas City, Kansas, United States
|
|-
| Loss
| align=center | 1–1
| Sijara Eubanks
| KO (head kick)
|rowspan=2| The Ultimate Fighter: A New World Champion
|  (air date)
| align=center | 1
| align=center | 1:25
|rowspan=2| Las Vegas, Nevada, United States
| 
|-
| Win
| align=center | 1–0
| Karine Gevorgyan
| TKO (punches)
|  (air date)
| align=center | 1
| align=center | 3:11
|

See also 
 List of female mixed martial artists
 List of current Bellator MMA fighters

References

External links
 DeAnna Bennett at Invicta FC
 

1984 births
Living people
Mixed martial artists from California
Flyweight mixed martial artists
Strawweight mixed martial artists
Mixed martial artists utilizing Muay Thai
Mixed martial artists utilizing wrestling
Mixed martial artists utilizing Brazilian jiu-jitsu
American female mixed martial artists
American people of Argentine descent
People from Fremont, California
American Muay Thai practitioners
Female Muay Thai practitioners
American practitioners of Brazilian jiu-jitsu
Female Brazilian jiu-jitsu practitioners
21st-century American women